We Are Gold is a Canadian drama film, directed by Éric Morin and released in 2019.

The film stars Monia Chokri as Marianne, a successful indie rock musician returning to her hometown in the Abitibi-Témiscamingue region of Quebec for the first time since the death of her parents in a mining accident ten years earlier.

The cast also includes Patrick Hivon, Vincent Bilodeau, Fabien Cloutier, Clare Coulter, Arsinée Khanjian, Alexis Martin, Emmanuel Schwartz, Steve Laplante and Catherine De Léan.

The film received two Prix Iris nominations at the 21st Quebec Cinema Awards, for Best Actor (Hivon) and Best Original Music (Philippe B).

References

External links 
 

2019 films
Films set in Abitibi-Témiscamingue
Canadian drama films
2010s French-language films
Films shot in Quebec
Quebec films
French-language Canadian films
2010s Canadian films